A usually clamshell case for a mechanical watch, common until the early twentieth century.

Watches